is a Japanese author of science fiction and fantasy. The film Yomigaeri is based on Kajio's novel of the same name and he also co-wrote the manga series  (2008) with Kenji Tsuruta (who additionally illustrated the series), which was serialized in Monthly Comic Ryu. The manga is based on his 1983 short story of the same title and became the beginning of his long-running series of "Emanon" short stories, about a mysterious girl born 3 billion years ago (and whose name is "No name" backwards). In 1971, he made his pro debut after his book, Pearls for Mia  (美亜へ贈る真珠, Mia e Okuru Shinjyu)  was published by Hayakawa Publishing Co (早川書房, Hayakawa Syobou). He won the 1991 Nihon SF Taisho Award.

Works in English translation
"Reiko's Universe Box" (Speculative Japan, Kurodahan Press, 2007)
"Emanon: A Reminiscence" (Speculative Japan 2, Kurodahan Press, 2011)
"The Husk Heir" (Vampiric: Tales of Blood and Roses from Japan, Kurodahan Press, 2019)

Notes

External links
 

Japanese science fiction writers
Japanese fantasy writers
People from Kumamoto Prefecture
Writers from Kumamoto Prefecture
1947 births
Living people